The 2019 Asia Rugby Championship division tournaments refers to the divisions played within the annual international rugby union tournament for the Asian region. The Asia Rugby Championship (ARC) replaced the Asian Five Nations tournament in 2015. The main tournament is now contested by the top three teams in Asia. The other national teams in Asia compete in three divisions.

Teams

The following teams were announced as playing the 2019 tournaments:

Pre-tournament world rankings in parentheses 

Division 1
  (64)
  (53)
  (57)
  (44)

Division 2
  (69)
  (62)
  (76)
  (70)

Division 3

West
  (N/A) (withdrawn)
  (N/A)
  (N/A)
  (N/A)

Central
  (93)
  (90)

South-East
  (87)
  (82)
  (102)

Division 1

The Division 1 Tournament was held from 29 May to 1 June at Taipei Municipal Stadium in Taipei, Taiwan.

Semi-Finals

Finals

Division 2

The Division 2 Tournament was held from 15–18 May at Bang Bon Sport Center in Bangkok, Thailand.

Semi-Finals

Finals

Division 3 West

The Division 3 West tournament was held from 2–5 April in Doha, Qatar.

Matches

Division 3 Central

The Division 3 Central tournament was held from 7–10 April in Lahore, Pakistan.

Matches

Division 3 East-South 

The Division 3 East-South tournament was held from 23–29 June in Jakarta, Indonesia.

Matches

References

2019
2019 in Asian rugby union
2019 rugby union tournaments for national teams